St Cyprian's Church, Sneinton is a parish church of the Church of England in Sneinton, Nottingham.

History

The church was built in 1935 by the architect C.E. Howitt. Construction work started in 1934 and the building was consecrated by Henry Mosley, the Bishop of Southwell on 15 May 1935. The estimated cost was £8,500 (equivalent to £ as of ),, most of which came from the Diocese of Southwell from the sale of the site of the former St. Paul's Church, George Street, Nottingham.

The church stands in the Traditional Catholic tradition of the Church of England. It has passed Resolutions A, B and C of the Act of Synod. As it rejects the ordination of women, the parish is under the Episcopal care of the Bishop of Beverley.

Medieval font
The font is the oldest item in the church. It is believed to be 13th or 14th Century and was found in a field between Gedling and Shelford. At the time of its discovery it was in use as a horse trough; the damage on the rim of the font is attributed to contact with the horses’ tack.

The font's original location is thought to have been Saxondale chapel, which was part of Shelford Priory. The chapel was demolished in the 15th Century.

When found it found a home in St Michael and All Angels, Foxhall Road (no longer standing). From there it was moved to St Cyprian's old church, and finally to the new building.

List of incumbents
Revd V.T. Macy 1913-1920
Revd Silk -
Revd C.S. Neale 1920-1927
Revd F.W. Killer 1927-1938
Revd T. I. V. Evans 1938-1961
Revd E. Weil 1961-1968
Revd G. France 1968- 1988
Revd William J. Gull 1990-1999
Revd K. Ball 2001-2005
Revd Andrew Waude 2007-2015

Organ
The organ was built by E. Wragg & Son and installed in 1935. It incorporated pipework from the organ in St. James' Church, Standard Hill. The specification of the organ can be found on the National Pipe Organ Register.

External links
See St. Cyprian's Church on Google Street View

Sources

Sneinton St. Cyprian
Churches completed in 1935
Sneinton
Sneiton
Sneinton